Tsui is a surname. It is an alternative transcription of two Chinese surnames, namely Cuī and Xú.

Origins
Tsui may be an alternative transliteration of two separate Chinese surnames, listed below by their Hanyu Pinyin transliteration (which reflects the Mandarin pronunciation):

Cuī, which originated as a toponymic surname from a fief by that name in the state of Qi; a grandson of Jiang Ziya renounced his claim to the throne and went to live in that fief, and his descendants took its name as their surname. It is spelled Ts'ui in the Wade–Giles system of transliterating Mandarin (which remains common in Taiwan and was used until the 20th century in other regions). The spelling Tsui may also be based on the Cantonese pronunciation.
Xú, which originated as a toponymic surname from the ancient state of Xu, adopted by the descendants of Boyi after the state was annexed by the state of Chu. The spelling Tsui is based on its Cantonese pronunciation; it is nearly homophonous with the above surname in Cantonese aside from the differing tone.

Statistics
The 2010 United States Census found 3,168 people with the surname Tsui, making it the 10,180th-most-common name in the country. This represented an increase from 2,725 (10,748th-most-common) in the 2000 Census. In both censuses, more than nine-tenths of the bearers of the surname identified as Asian, and roughly two percent as White.

People

Academics
Daniel C. Tsui (born 1939), Henan-born American physicist
Lap-Chee Tsui (born 1950), Shanghai-born Canadian geneticist
Tsui Tin-Chau (born 1958), Hong Kong-born Dutch teacher
Tsui Ming-sum, Hong Kong social scientist

Athletes
Tsui Fang-hsuan (born 1984), Taiwanese taekwondo practitioner
Tsui Wan Yi (born 1984), Hong Kong fencer
Tsui Chi Ho (born 1990), Hong Kong sprinter
Tsui Wang Kit (born 1997), Hong Kong footballer

Entertainment industry
Tsui Hsiao-ping (1923–2017), Jinan-born radio personality in Taiwan
Tsui Fu-sheng (1931–2013), Taiwanese actor
Tsui Ping (born 1938), Harbin-born Mandarin-language pop singer in Hong Kong
Paula Tsui (born 1949), Hong Kong singer
Tsui Hark (born 1950), Hong Kong film director
Tsui Siu-ming (born 1953), Hong Kong actor
Elvis Tsui (born 1961), Hong Kong actor
Tsui Wing (born 1974), Hong Kong actor
Kate Tsui (born 1979), Hong Kong actress
Roy Tsui (born 1980), Hong Kong lyricist
Sam Tsui (born 1989), American singer-songwriter

Other
Tsui Tsin-tong (1941–2010), Hong Kong businessman
Tsui Po-ko (1970–2006), Hong Kong police constable
Tsui Shung-yiu, Hong Kong civil servant
Tsui Teh-li, member of the Executive Board of the Boy Scouts of China

See also
Hui (surname), the Cantonese spelling of another surname transcribed as Xǔ in Pinyin

References

Chinese-language surnames
Multiple Chinese surnames
Cantonese-language surnames